Trachylepis tessellata, the tessellated mabuya, is a species of skink found in Yemen, Oman, and the United Arab Emirates.

References

tessellata
Reptiles described in 1895
Taxa named by John Anderson (zoologist)